Adrià Arjona Marín (born 28 February 1996) is a Spanish footballer who plays for Recreativo de Huelva as a winger.

Club career
Born in Vila-seca, Tarragona, Catalonia, Arjona joined FC Barcelona's La Masia in 2006, from CF Vilaseca. Released in 2009, he spent three seasons at Gimnàstic de Tarragona before returning to Barça in 2012.

On 23 August 2015, after finishing his formation, Arjona joined CF Reus Deportiu and was assigned to the farm team CD Morell in Tercera División. On 17 August of the following year, he was loaned to fellow league team UE Sant Andreu for a year.

Upon returning, Arjona was assigned to the B-team, now also in the fourth division. He made his first-team debut on 12 September, starting in a 2–1 away win against CA Osasuna, for the season's Copa del Rey.

On 18 July 2019, Arjona signed for AE Prat in Segunda División B, after Reus fell into severe economic problems.

In the summer of 2020, he joined CD Llosetense in Tercera División, in the midst of the club's projects of professional and managerial development. During the following winter transfer window, after just eight appearances with the Balearic club, Arjona decided to start his first journey overseas, as he was set to sign for South Korean team Gimpo FC, playing in the semi-professional K3 League.

However, the Spanish player got involved in a bureaucratic incident: in fact, despite having signed a pre-contract with the club and having sustained medicals, Arjona was eventually told by Gimpo's staff that, following a reunion with the city's mayor and the club's chairman, they couldn't take care of him anymore. Even though the club offered to help him find a new club in the country, the task wasn't successful, and Arjona eventually decided to fly back to Spain, reportedly "disappointed" by what happened to him, but also convinced that "nothing and no one would take his will to succeed as a professional football from him".

On February 23, 2021, Arjona officially announced that he joined SD Huesca and was set to play with their reserve team, in Tercera División. Having scored four goals in twelve matches, he played an important role as his side eventually made its own way through promotion to the newly-formed Segunda División RFEF. On June 21, the player announced the end of his experience in Huesca.

On July 11, 2021, it was announced that Arjona would join historic Spanish club Recreativo de Huelva, which was in the midst of a rebuilding process after falling all the way down to the Tercera División RFEF, the newly-formed fifth tier of the national football league system.

References

External links

1996 births
Living people
People from Tarragonès
Sportspeople from the Province of Tarragona
Spanish footballers
Footballers from Catalonia
Association football wingers
Segunda División players
Tercera División players
UE Sant Andreu footballers
CF Reus Deportiu B players
CF Reus Deportiu players
AE Prat players